Kaori Niyanagi (original name: 二柳 かおり, born  in Shiga) was a Japanese female weightlifter, competing in the 48 kg category and representing Japan at international competitions.

She participated at the 2000 Summer Olympics in the 48 kg event. She competed at world championships, most recently at the 1999 World Weightlifting Championships.

Major results

References

External links
 
http://www.news24.com/xArchive/Archive/Dragneva-snatches-first-weightlifting-gold-20000917
http://www.iwf.net/wp-content/uploads/downloads/2014/11/World-Weightlifting-Championships-2014-Mens-56kg.pdf
 http://www.gettyimages.com.au/photos/kaori-niyanagi?excludenudity=true&sort=mostpopular&mediatype=photography&phrase=kaori%20niyanagi

1977 births
Living people
Japanese female weightlifters
Weightlifters at the 2000 Summer Olympics
Olympic weightlifters of Japan
Place of birth missing (living people)
World Weightlifting Championships medalists
Weightlifters at the 1998 Asian Games
Asian Games competitors for Japan
People from Shiga Prefecture
20th-century Japanese women
21st-century Japanese women